The 2017 American Canadian Tour is the 31st season of the American Canadian Tour. The series began at Lee USA Speedway on April 8, and ends  at Thompson Speedway Motorsports Park on October 14. Nick Sweet is the defending champion.

Schedule

Notes

Driver roster

2017 ACT Invitational qualifiers

Race results

Governor's Cup 150

Driver's championship
(key) Bold – Pole position awarded by time. * – Most laps led.

References

External links
 ACT website

American Canadian Tour
American Canadian Tour